Igor Kotora (born 13 July 1989 in Nitra) is a Slovak football defender who currently plays for the 2. liga club MFK Lokomotíva Zvolen.

References

External links
 Futbalnet profile 
 

1989 births
Living people
Slovak footballers
Association football defenders
FC Nitra players
TJ Baník Ružiná players
TJ OFC Gabčíkovo players
MFK Lokomotíva Zvolen players
Slovak Super Liga players
Sportspeople from Nitra